Courtney Linford Lawes is an English professional rugby union player who plays as a second or back row for Northampton Saints in the Gallagher Premiership. He has made over 250 appearances for his club.

Early life and education
Lawes was born 23 February 1989 in Hackney to a Jamaican father and English mother and moved at the age of four to the town of Northampton where his mother was from.

Lawes attended Northampton School for Boys and is a product of Northampton Old Scouts, the same club that produced his former teammate Rob Milligan as well as Ben Cohen and Steve Thompson, amongst others.

Club career
In October 2007 Lawes made his Saints first team debut against Esher in National One in the 2007–08 season which ended in promotion. The following season he began to establish a reputation as a tackler, notably in the final of the 2009 European Challenge Cup against Bourgoin where he dislocated the shoulder of Morgan Parra and in the 2015 Six Nations Championship match against France with a tackle on Jules Plisson. In March 2010 Lawes was part of the side that beat Gloucester to win the Anglo-Welsh Cup and the following season saw him start in the 2011 Heineken Cup Final at the Millennium Stadium as Northampton finished runners up to Leinster.

In May 2013 Northampton were beaten by Leicester Tigers in the Premiership final however the following season saw Lawes play an integral part in Saints securing both the Premiership and European Rugby Challenge Cup titles in 2014. They beat Bath at Cardiff Arms Park to win the Challenge Cup and the following weekend defeated Saracens to win their first ever Premiership title.

Lawes was shortlisted for the Saints Supporters' Player of the Season in 2016/17 but lost out to teammate, Louis Picamoles.

International career

England
Lawes won England representative honours for the U18 side and toured Australia with England Under 18s in 2007. He missed out on the 2008 U20s Six Nations through injury but featured in the IRB Junior World Championship that year. In the summer of 2009 Lawes started for the England Under 20 team that finished runners up to New Zealand in the final of the 2009 IRB Junior World Championship in Tokyo.

In July 2009, Lawes was selected for the England Saxons squad and on 26 October 2009 he received his first call-up by coach Martin Johnson to the senior England squad. He made his England debut on 7 November 2009 in the 18–9 defeat against Australia at Twickenham, replacing Louis Deacon for the last twelve minutes of the match. He was included in the squad for the 2011 Rugby World Cup and started in their quarter-final elimination against France.

After the World Cup new coach Stuart Lancaster continued to select Lawes and in December 2012 he featured in a win over New Zealand. He was selected for the 2015 Rugby World Cup and featured in two pool games against Fiji and Wales as the hosts failed to make the knockout phase.

Lawes participated in the 2016 Six Nations Championship as England achieved their first Grand Slam in over a decade. He came off the bench in all three tests as England completed a series whitewash on their 2016 tour of Australia and later that year scored his first international try on his fiftieth cap against South Africa. The following year saw Lawes start in the last match of the 2017 Six Nations Championship which England lost away to Ireland ensuring they failed to complete consecutive grand slams and also brought an end to a record equalling eighteen successive Test victories.

Lawes was included in the squad for the 2019 Rugby World Cup.  He started all three knockout games against Australia in the quarter-final, victory over New Zealand in the semi-final and defeat to South Africa in the final as England finished runners up. Lawes was a member of the side that won the 2020 Six Nations Championship. On 6 November 2021, Lawes captained England for the first time, in a game against Tonga.

British and Irish Lions
On 19 April 2017, it was announced that Lawes would be heading to New Zealand with the British & Irish Lions for their summer tour, with his Saints teammate George North. Lawes was handed his first Lions starting place for the Lions' second game of the tour, against the Blues. He did not feature in the first test but did come off the bench in the second and third tests as the series finished level.

Lawes was also selected by coach Warren Gatland for the 2021 British & Irish Lions tour to South Africa. He started all three tests at flanker as the Lions lost the series 2-1.

International tries

Personal life
As of 2017, Lawes and his wife Jessica have four children.

Honours
England
 Six Nations Championship: 2016, 2017, 2020
 Rugby World Cup runner-up: 2019

Northampton Saints
 Premiership: 2013-14 
 Anglo-Welsh Cup: 2009-10
 EPCR Challenge Cup: 2008-09, 2013-14
 RFU Championship: 2007-08

 European Rugby Champions Cup runner up: 2010-11
 Premiership runner up: 2012-13

References

External links

Official Website
Northampton Saints Profile
England Profile

1989 births
Living people
Black British sportspeople
British & Irish Lions rugby union players from England
England international rugby union players
English rugby union players
Northampton Saints players
People educated at Northampton School for Boys
Rugby union flankers
Rugby union locks
Rugby union players from Hackney